Formby may refer to:

People
 George Formby, Jr. (1904–1961), English singer, comedian, actor, famous for his banjo ukulele
 George Formby, Sr. (1875–1921), Edwardian music hall comedian, father of George Formby, Jr.
 Henry Formby (1816–1884), English Roman Catholic priest and writer
 Bent Formby, Danish biochemist
 Margaret Formby (1929–2003), founder of the National Cowgirl Museum and Hall of Fame in Texas
Jennie Formby, British trade unionist (Unite) and member of the British Labour party
 Mark Formby, American politician from Mississippi, member of Mississippi House of Representative
 Marshall Formby (1911–1984), Texas state senator, lawyer, newspaper publisher, radio executive
Nicola Formby (born 1965), South African model, actress, and journalist
 Clint Formby (1923–2010), radio presenter in Texas

Other
 Formby, a town in Merseyside, England
 Formby railway station in the town of Formby
 Formby F.C., a football club in the town of Formby
 Formby Gang, a criminal Chicago street gang in late 1890s to early 1900s